"Zombie" is a song by Congolese-French singer and rapper Maître Gims from the reissue of the album Subliminal, released in December 2013. The song was written and composed by Maître Gims and Renaud Rebillaud.

Charts

References 

2013 songs
2013 singles
Gims songs
Songs written by Gims